The 1947–48 Copa México was the 32nd staging of the Copa México, and the 5th staging in the professional era.

The competition started on July 1, 1948, and concluded on July 25, 1948, with the final, in which Veracruz lifted the trophy for the first time ever with a 1–3 victory over Guadalajara.

This edition was played by 15 teams, in a knock-out stage, in a single match.

First round

Played June 1 and July 4

|}

Bye: San Sebastián

Quarterfinals

Played July 11

|}

Semifinals

Played July 18

|}

Final

Played July 25

|}

References
Mexico - Statistics of Copa México in season 1947/1948. (RSSSF)

1947-48
1947–48 in Mexican football
1947–48 domestic association football cups